The Bowlus 1-S-2100 Senior Albatross was a 1930s single-seat glider designed by William Hawley Bowlus for Bowlus Sailplane Company Ltd. The aircraft is based on a prototype glider the "Super Sailplane" designed by Bowlus, and instructor Martin Schempp, built by students at the Curtiss-Wright Technical Institute.

Specifications

See also

References

Bibliography

Coates, Andrew, Jane's World Sailplanes and Motorgliders. London. Macdonald and Jane's Publishers Ltd., 1978. 
Simons, Martin. Sailplanes 1920 - 1945 (Volume 1). Eqip Werbung & Verlag Gmbh (2004)

External links

Bowlus 1-S-2100 Senior Albatross
Bowlus 1-S-2100 Senior Albatross in National Air and Space Museum
Images of the Senior Albatross in the National Soaring Museum

1930s United States sailplanes
Glider aircraft
1-S-2100
Aircraft first flown in 1933